William Maxwell may refer to:

Arts
William Maxwell (engraver) (c. 1766–1809), printer of the Sentinel of the Northwest Territory newspaper in Cincinnati, Ohio
W. B. Maxwell (William Babington Maxwell, 1866–1938), British novelist
William Hamilton Maxwell (1792–1850), Scots-Irish novelist
William James Maxwell (1843–1903), Scottish-born sculptor in Australia
William Keepers Maxwell Jr. (1908–2000), American editor and writer

Education
William Maxwell (educator) (1784–1857), seventh President of Hampden–Sydney College
William Henry Maxwell (1852–1920), superintendent of public schools in New York City

Medicine
William Maxwell (physician) (1581–1641), Scottish physician
William Maxwell (physician) (1769–1826), Scottish physician

Military
William Maxwell (Continental Army general) (1733–1796), Irish-born American soldier from New Jersey in the American Revolutionary War
William C. Maxwell (1892–1920), American pilot in the United States Air Force

Politics and administration
Sir William Maxwell, 5th Baronet, of Monreith, British MP for Wigtownshire, 1805–1812 and 1822–1830
William Maxwell (Australian politician) (1867–1921), gold miner and member of the Queensland Legislative Assembly
William Maxwell (co-operator) (1841–1929), Scottish co-operative activist
William Maxwell (railroad executive) (1794–1856), American business executive and politician, president of the Erie Railroad 1842–1843
William Edward Maxwell, British colonial official, governor of the Gold Coast
George Maxwell (administrator) (William George Maxwell, 1871–1959), British naturalist and colonial administrator in British Malaya and Straits Settlements
William Herries Maxwell (1852–1933), British MP for Dumfriesshire, 1892–1895 and 1900–1906
William John Maxwell, 18th Naval Governor of Guam

Sports
William Maxwell (footballer) (1876–1940), Scottish footballer, manager of the Belgium national football team
Bill Maxwell (1882–1917), Australian rules footballer

Other
William Maxwell, 5th Earl of Nithsdale (1676–1744), Catholic nobleman
William Maxwell (journalist) (1860–1928), British journalist, soldier, writer and civil servant
William Sutherland Maxwell (1874–1952), Canadian architect and a Hand of the Cause in the Bahá'í Faith

See also
Billy Maxwell (1929–2021), American golfer
Charles William Maxwell (1775–1848), governor of the British crown colony of Sierra Leone 1811–1815
Willie Maxwell, birth name of American rapper Fetty Wap